Frank Frost (1936–1999) was an American blues musician.

Frank Frost may also refer to:

 Frank Frost (soccer), American football player at the 1904 Summer Olympics
 Frank A. Frost (1874–1947), New York state senator
 Frank Dutton Frost (1882–1968), British Army officer
 Frank J. Frost (born 1929), American scholar of Ancient Greek history, archaeologist, politician, and novelist

See also
 Francis Theodore Frost (1843–1916), Canadian politician 
 Francis Seth Frost (1825–1902), painter, photographer and businessman